The Little long-tailed dunnart (Sminthopsis dolichura) is a dunnart that was, along with Gilbert's dunnart, described in 1984.

Distribution and habitat
There are two separate areas of habitation for this species, but no subspecies have been identified. The Western Australia distribution is in the northern Goldfield's and Geraldton hinterland, northwest coast, southwest coast and western plateau. The South Australian area includes the coastal areas of the Great Australian Bight on the Nullarbor Plain, Eyre Peninsula west of Port Augusta. Habitat the species prefers include dry sclerophyll, forest, semi-arid woodlands, mallee, (tall, tall open and low open) shrublands and open heath vegetation.

Social organisation and breeding
The species is nocturnal with males having a large home range, an adaptation to exploiting various habitats from one season to another. Females breed as early as 5–8 months and then only between March and August. Males can breed at 4–5 months. The joeys are weaned during September–December or when 5 grams. The lifespan of females is approximately two years and males just over one year.

Diet
Primarily an insect eater, the little long-tailed dunnart will also consume small reptiles, amphibians and mammals.

References

External links
Little Long-tailed Dunnart
Pictures and facts about the Little long-tailed dunnart
Image of the type specimen's skull

Dasyuromorphs
Mammals of Western Australia
Mammals of South Australia
Marsupials of Australia
Mammals described in 1984
Taxa named by Darrell Kitchener